Patricia Heaton Parties is an American cooking television series that aired on Food Network. It was presented by actress Patricia Heaton, and it featured Heaton showcasing how to prepare different recipes for themed parties. The series debuted on October 24, 2015, and was initially supposed to air for only one season, but a second season began airing on June 11, 2016; and concluded on August 13, 2016.

In 2016, the series won a Daytime Emmy Award for Outstanding Culinary Program.

Episodes

Season 1 (2015)

Season 2 (2016)

Notes

References

External links
 
 

2010s American cooking television series
2015 American television series debuts
2016 American television series endings
Daytime Emmy Award for Outstanding Culinary Program winners
English-language television shows
Food Network original programming
Food reality television series
Television series by Relativity Media